Ute M. Ebert is a German physicist known for her research on plasma physics and electric discharge in gases. She is a researcher in the Netherlands at the Centrum Wiskunde & Informatica, where she heads the research group on multiscale dynamics, and a part-time full professor at the Eindhoven University of Technology, affiliated with the Elementary Processes in Gas Discharges group.

Education and career
Ebert was a physics student at Heidelberg University from 1980 to 1987, and at the Hebrew University of Jerusalem from 1987 to 1988. She completed a doctorate (Dr. rer. nat.) in 1994 at the University of Essen.

After postdoctoral research at Leiden University, she became a researcher at the Centrum Wiskunde & Informatica (CWI) in 1998, and added her part-time affiliation with the Eindhoven University of Technology (TU/e) in 2002.

Research
 Ebert's doctoral dissertation, Diffusion langer Polymerketten in einem eingefrorenen Zufallsmedium: eine Renormierungsgruppenanalyse, concerned the use of renormalization to analyze the diffusion of polymers; she also studied phytoplankton dynamics before shifting to her present interest in gas discharges. Her research projects on this topic at CWI are more theoretical, while her work at TU/e is experimental and applied.

 Ebert's groups currently work on projects on lightning physics, high voltage technology in the context of electricity nets, and applications of pulsed plasmas in agriculture and combustion engines. She has made important contributions to the modelling of lightning using partial differential equations. She is a specialist in analytical model reductions, numerical multiscale modelling and non-linear dynamics. For example, in her joint work with numerical analysists she managed to mimic lightning discharges to a very detailed level. Laboratorium experiments sustained and confirmed the theoretical research.

Ebert published over 170 articles in international peer-reviewed journals. She was the principal advisor of 15 PhD students, all at the TU/e. Most of them worked on one of the big projects for which Ebert was (one of) the principal investigator(s). Ebert and her students worked on three out of seven STW projects in the programme 'Building on Transient Plasmas' (2009). She and her co-authors developed models describing how lightning starts in thunder clouds, namely by an interaction between sharp-edged hail and cosmic particles.  Another important project, financed by STW en ABB Corporate Research, was the 'Creeping sparks project' in which Ebert and her students developed novel mathematical models and techniques to better understand the fundamental physics of sparks creeping along insulator surfaces.

Recognition
Ebert won the Minerva Prize, a biennial prize for the best Dutch physics publication by a woman, in 2004. She has been a member of the Koninklijke Hollandsche Maatschappij der Wetenschappen since 2006.

References

External links
Home page @ CWI

Ute Ebert on Electric Breakdown in Thunderstorms (video), Michigan Institute for Plasma Science and Engineering

Year of birth missing (living people)
Living people
21st-century Dutch physicists
Dutch women physicists
21st-century German physicists
German women physicists
Heidelberg University alumni
Hebrew University of Jerusalem alumni
University of Duisburg-Essen alumni
Academic staff of the Eindhoven University of Technology
Members of the Koninklijke Hollandsche Maatschappij der Wetenschappen
21st-century Dutch women scientists
21st-century German women scientists